Aitor Monroy Rueda (born 18 October 1987) is a Spanish professional footballer who plays for RSD Alcalá as a defensive midfielder.

Club career
Born in Madrid, Monroy signed with Atlético Madrid in 2005 from neighbouring club RSD Alcalá. He could only represent the C and B teams over a four-year spell, the latter in the Segunda División B.

From 2009 to 2011, Monroy continued to compete in division three, with UD Logroñés. He missed most of his first season due to injury, appearing in just 12 league games.

Monroy's first top-flight experience occurred in 2011–12, with FC Ceahlăul Piatra Neamț in Romania. In the following campaign he played 28 Liga I matches and scored his first goal as a professional, in a 3–0 win against CS Concordia Chiajna.

In January 2014, Monroy transferred to fellow league side CFR Cluj for €40,000. That November, he chose to terminate his contract over unpaid wages, and the following February he signed with Moldovan National Division's FC Sheriff Tiraspol.

After two seasons with Maccabi Petah Tikva F.C. of the Israeli Premier League, Monroy returned to Romania in January 2018, signing for FC Dinamo București. In the following years, he represented in quick succession FC Dunărea Călărași (Romanian top flight), Internacional de Madrid (Spanish third tier) and Jamshedpur FC (Indian Super League).

Monroy returned to the Spanish lower leagues and Alcalá in March 2022, aged 34.

Club statistics

References

External links

1987 births
Living people
Spanish footballers
Footballers from Madrid
Association football midfielders
Segunda División B players
Tercera División players
Tercera Federación players
RSD Alcalá players
Atlético Madrid C players
Atlético Madrid B players
UD Logroñés players
Internacional de Madrid players
Liga I players
CSM Ceahlăul Piatra Neamț players
CFR Cluj players
FC Dinamo București players
FC Dunărea Călărași players
Moldovan Super Liga players
FC Sheriff Tiraspol players
Israeli Premier League players
Maccabi Petah Tikva F.C. players
Indian Super League players
Jamshedpur FC players
Spanish expatriate footballers
Expatriate footballers in Romania
Expatriate footballers in Moldova
Expatriate footballers in Israel
Expatriate footballers in India
Spanish expatriate sportspeople in Romania
Spanish expatriate sportspeople in Moldova
Spanish expatriate sportspeople in Israel
Spanish expatriate sportspeople in India